The 1931 U.S. National Championships (now known as the US Open) was a tennis tournament that took place on the outdoor grass courts at the West Side Tennis Club, Forest Hills in New York City, United States. The tournament ran from September 3 until September 10. It was the 51st staging of the U.S. National Championships and the fourth Grand Slam tennis event of the year.

Finals

Men's singles

 Ellsworth Vines defeated  George Lott 7–9, 6–3, 9–7, 7–5

Women's singles

 Helen Wills Moody defeated  Eileen Bennett Whittingstall 6–4, 6–1

Men's doubles

 Wilmer Allison /  John Van Ryn defeated  Gregory Mangin /  Berkeley Bell 6–4, 8–6, 6–3

Women's doubles
 Betty Nuthall /  Eileen Bennett Whittingstall defeated  Helen Jacobs /  Dorothy Round 6–2, 6–4

Mixed doubles
 Betty Nuthall /  George Lott defeated  Anna McCune Harper /  Wilmer Allison 6–3, 6–3

References

External links
Official US Open website

 
Us National Championships (Tennis), 1931
U.S. National Championships (tennis) by year
U.S. National Championships
U.S. National Championships
U.S. National Championships
U.S. National Championships